The following is a list of Ministers of National Defense of Turkey.

See also
Ministry of National Defence (Turkey) employees: 424.269

 employees: 351.176 military, 391.695 total

External links
Turkish ministries, etc – Rulers.org

Ministers of National Defence
National Defence

 
Turkey